The following are international corn production statistics

The quantities of corn (maize, Zea mays) in the following table are in million metric tonnes (m STs, m LTs). All countries with a typical production quantity of at least  are listed below.

References 

Corn
Corn
 
Corn